Fillmore is an unincorporated community in Dubuque County, Iowa, United States.

History
 Fillmore's population was 30 in 1887, and was 115 in 1902.

Education
Residents are zoned to the Western Dubuque Community School District. They are assigned to Cascade Elementary School and Cascade Junior/Senior High School, both in Cascade.

References

Unincorporated communities in Dubuque County, Iowa
Unincorporated communities in Iowa